Brachycerus bufo is a species of weevil in the family Curculionidae, subfamily Brachycerinae.

Description 
The body is black, with yellowish spots. The abdomen is rounded. "Bufo," meaning toad, is so named because of the irregular surface of its carapace.

References 

  Zipcodezoo
  Catalogue of Life

Brachycerinae